"Let's Chill" is a song released by American R&B band Guy from the album The Future. Co-written by Bernard Belle and Teddy Riley, it was released as the second single from the album on February 18, 1991. It reached #41 on the U.S. Billboard Hot 100, #10 on the Hot Dance Singles Sales chart and #3 on the R&B/Hip-hop singles chart; it was the highest-charting single by Guy on the Hot 100 at the time, not to be beat until 1999's "Dancin'".

Track list
 Vinyl 12" promo
 Let's Chill (LP Version) – 5:23
 Let's Chill (edit) – 4:31
 Let's Chill (instrumental) – 6:52
 Let's Chill (suite) – 6:53

 Vinyl, 12", promo
 Let's Chill (extended remix version) – 7:04
 Let's Chill (The Seduction Soliloguy) – 7:02
 Let's Chill (radio edit) – 4:49
 Let's Chill (chilled suite) – 6:30
 Let's Chill (chilled vocal version) – 6:30
 Let's Chill (Quiet Storm version) – 6:28

 CD, maxi–single
 Let's Chill (extended remix version) – 7:04
 Let's Chill (The Seduction Soliloguy) – 7:02
 Let's Chill (chilled vocal version) – 6:30

 12", vinyl
 Let's Chill (extended remix version) – 7:04
 Let's Chill (The Seduction Soliloguy) – 7:02
 Let's Chill (chilled vocal version) – 6:30

Charts

Weekly charts

Year-end charts

References

Guy (band) songs
1991 singles
Songs written by Teddy Riley
Song recordings produced by Teddy Riley
MCA Records singles
Songs written by Bernard Belle
1990 songs